Demi Vollering (born 15 November 1996) is a Dutch professional racing cyclist, who currently rides for UCI Women's WorldTeam . In 2019 she won the Volta Limburg Classic and the Giro dell'Emilia. In 2021 she won Liège–Bastogne–Liège, her first win in a monument classic.

Major results

2018
 9th Overall Tour of Uppsala
2019
 1st Giro dell'Emilia
 1st Volta Limburg Classic
 2nd Overall Grand Prix Elsy Jacobs
1st Prologue
 3rd Liège–Bastogne–Liège
 5th La Flèche Wallonne
 5th Overall The Women's Tour
 5th GP de Plouay
 7th Amstel Gold Race
2020
 3rd Overall Setmana Ciclista Valenciana
 3rd La Course by Le Tour de France
 3rd La Flèche Wallonne
 7th Gent–Wevelgem
 7th Tour of Flanders
2021
 1st  Overall The Women's Tour
1st Stage 3 (ITT)
 1st La Course by Le Tour de France
 1st Liège–Bastogne–Liège
 2nd Amstel Gold Race
 2nd Brabantse Pijl
 2nd Emakumeen Nafarroako Klasikoa
 UEC European Road Championships
3rd  Mixed relay
5th Road race
 3rd Overall Vuelta a Burgos
 5th Tour of Flanders
 6th Strade Bianche
 7th Road race, UCI Road World Championships
 10th La Flèche Wallonne
2022
 1st  Overall Itzulia Women
1st  Points classification
1st Stages 1, 2 & 3
 1st Brabantse Pijl
 2nd Overall Tour de France 
1st  Mountains classification
 2nd Omloop Het Nieuwsblad
 2nd Amstel Gold Race
 3rd Overall Vuelta a Burgos
1st  Mountains classification
1st Stage 4
 3rd La Flèche Wallonne
 3rd Liège–Bastogne–Liège
 4th Overall Grand Prix Elsy Jacobs
2023
 1st Strade Bianche

General classification results timeline

Classics results timeline

Major championship results timeline

References

External links
 

1996 births
Living people
Dutch female cyclists
People from Pijnacker-Nootdorp
Olympic cyclists of the Netherlands
Cyclists at the 2020 Summer Olympics
Cyclists from South Holland